Sean or Shawn Dixon may refer to:

Sean Dixon (ice hockey) in 1999 NHL Entry Draft
Sean Dixon (writer) published by Coach House Books
Sean Dixon (motorcyclist) in 1991 United States motorcycle Grand Prix
Shawn Dixon, soccer player in All-time Northern Virginia Royals roster

See also
Sean Dickson (disambiguation)